Thila is an impact crater on Mars, located in the Elysium quadrangle at 18.09° N and 204.58° W. It measures approximately  in diameter and was named after the village of Thila in Yemen.

See also 
 Impact event
 List of craters on Mars
 Ore resources on Mars
 Planetary nomenclature

References

Impact craters on Mars
Elysium quadrangle